This article presents a list of the historical events and publications of Australian literature during 1975.

Events 
 Radical poet Dorothy Hewett publishes her collection Rapunzel in Suburbia, triggering a successful libel action by her lawyer ex-husband Lloyd Davies.

Major publications

Books 
 James Aldridge – The Untouchable Juli
 Jessica Anderson – The Commandant
 Jon Cleary – The Safe House
 Frank Hardy – But the Dead Are Many
 Xavier Herbert – Poor Fellow My Country
 Thomas Keneally
 Gossip from the Forest
 Moses the Lawgiver
 David Malouf – Johnno

Short stories 
 Murray Bail
 Contemporary Portraits and Other Stories
 "The Drover's Wife"
 Peter Carey – "Do You Love Me?"

Science Fiction and Fantasy 
 A. Bertram Chandler – The Broken Cycle
 Sumner Locke Elliott – Going
 Lee Harding – A World of Shadows
 Cordwainer Smith
 The Best of Cordwainer Smith
 Norstrilia

Children's and Young Adult fiction 
 Elyne Mitchell – The Colt at Taparoo

Poetry 

 Gwen Harwood – Selected Poems
 Dorothy Hewett – Rapunzel in Suburbia
 A. D. Hope – A Late Picking : Poems 1965-1974
 Kate Jennings – Mother I'm Rooted : An Anthology of Australian Women Poets (edited)
 Les Murray – "The Powerline Incarnation"
 Peter Porter
 "An Exequy"
 Living in a Calm Country
 Thomas Shapcott – Shabbytown Calendar

Drama 

 Robert J. Merritt – The Cake Man
 Steve J. Spears – The Elocution of Benjamin Franklin

Biography 
 Charles Perkins – A Bastard Like Me

Non-fiction 
 Geoffrey Blainey – Triumph of the Nomads : A History of Ancient Australia
 Anne Summers – Damned Whores and God's Police

Awards and honours

Lifetime achievement

Literary

Children and Young Adult

Poetry

Births 
A list, ordered by date of birth (and, if the date is either unspecified or repeated, ordered alphabetically by surname) of births in 1975 of Australian literary figures, authors of written works or literature-related individuals follows, including year of death.

 23 June — Markus Zusak, novelist
Unknown date

 Nardi Simpson, novelist and musician

Deaths 
A list, ordered by date of death (and, if the date is either unspecified or repeated, ordered alphabetically by surname) of deaths in 1975 of Australian literary figures, authors of written works or literature-related individuals follows, including year of birth.

 11 January — Paul Grano, poet and journalist (born 1894)

Unknown date
 Winifred Birkett, novelist (born 1897)

See also 
 1975 in Australia
1975 in literature
 1975 in poetry
 List of years in Australian literature
List of years in literature

References

 
Australian literature by year
20th-century Australian literature
1975 in literature